I Am is the third studio album by American metalcore band Toothgrinder. The album was released on October 11, 2019 through Spinefarm Records.

Lyrical themes
Opening track "The Silence of a Sleeping WASP" is a sequel to "The Shadow" from the band's previous album Phantom Amour. Lyrically, the songs deal with Carl Jung's concept of the shadow and how it deals with addiction and alcoholism. The album's title track also deals with themes of addiction, along with depression, anxiety, and co-dependency, among others.

Reception
I Am polarized critics upon its release.

Cryptic Rock gave the album a perfect score of 5/5, calling I Am the band's most complete work to date. Distorted Sound gave the album a highly positive review, praising the album's experimental but accessible sound along with Matthews's emotional lyrics.

Zach Buggy of Dead Press! gave the album an overwhelmingly negative review, saying the aggressiveness of Nocturnal Masquerade and the progressiveness of Phantom Amour have been diluted and "boiled down into a melting pot of half-baked ideas" that results in "a bland, accessible mess." Buggy said the band comes off as "a less obnoxious Five Finger Death Punch, or as metal’s answer to Imagine Dragons." Exclaim!'s Max Morin also gave an overwhelmingly negative review, saying the album sounds like every metal song on Sirius XM meshed together, resulting in a sound similar to Shinedown and Bring Me the Horizon. Morin claimed the record was Toothgrinder selling out, getting rid of many of its heavier and experimental elements for a "pop sheen" and "radio-friendly production." Morin did praise the title track for the confessional lyrics of Justin Matthews and for the djent style riff.

Track listing

Personnel
Justin Matthews – lead vocals
Johnuel Hasney – lead guitar, backing vocals
Jason Goss – rhythm guitar
Matt Arensdorf – bass, backing vocals
Wills Weller – drums

References

2019 albums
Toothgrinder albums
Spinefarm Records albums
Albums produced by Matt Squire